Emma Meissner, née Ekström (30 October 1866 in Karlstad – 20 November 1942 in Stockholm) was a Swedish soprano and actress.

Biography
Emma Olivia Ekström  was born in Karlstad to Johan Fredrik Ekström and Anna Brita Pettersson.
She worked in the choir at Mindre teatern in Stockholm 1881–1883. Her first role was as a character in the opera Sjökadetten. She was a student at the conservatory in Stockholm 1884–1885, and then studied for Fritz Arlberg (1830-1896) and Signe Hebbe (1837–1925) from 1885–1886. She then worked at Södra Teatern in Stockholm 1888–1889.

She got her big breakthrough at Vasateatern in Stockholm during 1890 as Yum Yum in The Mikado.

She was married from 1899 to opera conductor Hjalmar Meissner (1865-1940). He was employed by  theatre director Albert Ranft (1858–1938)  and was the second conductor at his theaters until 1925, with the exception of a period 1908-1910 at the Royal Swedish Opera and 1914 at the Gothenburg Symphony Orchestra.

References

Further reading
 

1866 births
1942 deaths
Swedish sopranos
Actresses from Stockholm
19th-century Swedish actresses
Swedish stage actresses
Swedish film actresses
Swedish silent film actresses